Itzhak Marili (born 12 May 1945) is an Israeli former footballer.

His younger brother is Zion Marilil also a former footballer.

Career
Marili strated to play football for the Hapoel Jerusalem's youth team. On 1966 signed for the senior team and played there a decade.

He took a part in the 1968 AFC Asian Cup.

Honours
 Hapoel Jerusalem
Israel State Cup: 1972–73

References

External links
 
 

1945 births
Living people
Israeli footballers
Hapoel Jerusalem F.C. players
Israel international footballers
Footballers from Jerusalem
Association football defenders
1968 AFC Asian Cup players